NK Croatia Sesvete was a Croatian football club based in the Sesvete district of the City of Zagreb.

Previous club names: NK Sljeme (1957–1988), NK Sesvete (1988–1996), NK Badel Sesvete (1996–1997), NK Sesvete (1997–1998).

The club was dissolved in 2012 due to financial irregularities. Newly formed NK Croatia Prigorje is seen as club's spiritual successor.

2010 Match fixing scandal
In June 2010 Croatian Police started making arrests connected to match fixing in the Croatian League. 20 players in total, including 9 players from Croatia Sesvete were arrested. The nine were: Miljenko Bošnjak, Goran Jerković, Saša Mus, Ante Pokrajčić, Mario Čižmek, Marko Guja, Ivan Banović and Dario Šušak. It was also claimed by the police that 7 of Sesvete's 8 last matches in the league were fixed. The players received up to 40 thousand euros for the match-fixing. In some cases, players even made "safe" bets on their own games.

Honours
Druga HNL (1): 2007–08

Recent seasons

Key

Top scorer shown in bold when he was also top scorer for the division.

 P = Played
 W = Games won
 D = Games drawn
 L = Games lost
 F = Goals for
 A = Goals against
 Pts = Points
 Pos = Final position

 1. HNL = Prva HNL
 2. HNL = Druga HNL
 3. HNL = Treća HNL

 PR = Preliminary round
 R1 = Round 1
 R2 = Round 2
 QF = Quarter-finals
 SF = Semi-finals
 RU = Runners-up
 W = Winners

References

External links
 Croatia Sesvete profile at UEFA.com
 Croatia Sesvete profile at Nogometni magazin 

 
Association football clubs established in 1957
Football clubs in Zagreb
1957 establishments in Croatia
2012 disestablishments in Croatia